DOVE International is a Christian ministry founded by Larry and Laverne Kreider involved with churches and ministries in five continents. DOVE is an acronym which states “Declaring Our Victory Emmanuel". Prominent Christian publisher, Baker Book group has published President Kreider's book, "The Cry for Spiritual Mothers and Fathers".".

History 
In the late 1970s, Larry and Laverne Kreider started a small group Bible study to reach unchurched youth in Lancaster County, Pennsylvania.  The Kreiders were unable to connect these youth to local churches in their area.  Larry Kreider began an "underground church" in response to this problem.

Kreider recruited some young couples to help in leadership of small groups.  These groups met together in a large living room for their first Sunday Morning celebration in October 1980. DOVE Christian Fellowship was born.

First Ten Years - DOVE Christian Fellowship grew to over 2,000 believers scattered throughout a seven-county region of Pennsylvania. More than one hundred small groups met during the week and on Sunday mornings.

Small Group Churches Emerge 1996 - Eight small group-based churches were created from the one. Included were three other small group churches in Kenya, Uganda and New Zealand. The leadership of these churches were turned over to "senior elders".

The Apostolic Council, led by Larry Kreider, was created to train, oversee and mentor new local leaders throughout the world.☃☃ The council oversees  the DOVE International family of churches and includes leaders actively involved with the ministry.

The Members of the Apostolic Council are Larry and LaVerne Kreider, Ron and Bonnie Myer, Peter and Ruth Ann Bunton, Chad and Chris Miller, Hesbone and Violet Odindo, Ibrahim and Diane Omondi, Steve and Mary Prokopchak, and Brian and Janet Sauder.

International Ventures 
In the book, the "Challenges of the Pentecostal, Charismatic and Messianic Jewish Movements", author Peter Hocken highlights the international role Dove International Churches are playing in the spread of Penticostalism. 

Over 400 churches and house churches are affiliated with the DOVE International "apostolic movement" in various places like DOVE Westgate Church in USA,☃☃ as well as other church in 20 nations. DOVE International also includes churches in Europe

DOVE International leaders have held conferences and training worldwide.

Church and House Church Planting is one of the focuses of their work. DOVE International have a significant number of churches in east Africa.

Publishing 
DOVE International has published 500,000 units of materials in over 70 publications on topics concerning churches, leadership and Christian life. The publishing arm has produced materials used by churches and organizations. One such ministry training organization is Christian Leaders Institute, which uses DOVE International's materials on House Churches.

Peer Review Membership 
DOVE International is a member of a peer accountability organization called ACEA. This organization was founded by C.Peter Wagner, a former professor of Fuller Theological Seminary.

References 

Christian organizations based in the United States